The first USS James River (SP-861) was a United States Navy patrol vessel in commission from 1917 to 1918.

James River was built as a civilian motorboat of the same name by C. Crockett at Pocomoke City, Maryland. In May 1917, the U.S. Navy acquired her from her owner, the Virginia State Fish and Oyster Commission, for use as a section patrol boat during World War I. She was commissioned as USS James River (SP-861).

Assigned to the 5th Naval District, James River patrolled Pocomoke Sound, the James River, the Elizabeth River, and other parts of the lower Chesapeake Bay until just under three weeks before the end of World War I.

James River was returned to the Virginia State Fish and Oyster Commission on 22 October 1918.

References

SP-861 James River at Department of the Navy Naval History and Heritage Command Online Library of Selected Images: U.S. Navy Ships -- Listed by Hull Number: "SP" #s and "ID" #s -- World War I Era Patrol Vessels and other Acquired Ships and Craft numbered from SP-800 through SP-899
NavSource Online: Section Patrol Craft Photo Archive James River (SP 861)

Patrol vessels of the United States Navy
World War I patrol vessels of the United States
Ships built in Pocomoke City, Maryland